Miss Universe Jamaica (formerly Miss Jamaica Universe) is a beauty pageant that selects the contestant to represent Jamaica at the Miss Universe beauty pageant.

History
Although Jamaica started competing at the Miss Universe Pageant in 1961, the Miss Universe Jamaica pageant officially started in 1982 and was organised by Ed Wallace to select the official representative. This was won by Nancy Martin who was slated to compete at the Miss Universe pageant, but was unable to do so. The contest was again held from 1986 to 1988, and in 1989 Pulse was asked to host the Jamaica preliminary to Miss Universe. They went on to post an outstanding record, producing 4 top 10 finalists (Sandra Foster, Kimberley Mais, Nicole Haughton and Christine Straw) at the international Pageant. The pageant was then promoted by Invyte Promotions (2010–2011), hotelier Dimitris Kosvogiannis (2012). Uzuri International became and still remains the Miss Universe Jamaica franchise owner in 2013. The organization has sent two of Jamaica's most popular Miss Universe titleholders, 2014's Kaci Fennell and 2017's Davina Bennett.

Titleholders

The Miss Universe Jamaica organization is responsible for sending representatives to Miss Universe. On occasion, when the winner does not qualify (due to age) for either contest, a runner-up is sent.

See also
 Miss Jamaica World

References

External links
Official website 
Official website Uzuri International Organization 

Jamaica
Beauty pageants in Jamaica
Jamaican awards
1961 establishments in Jamaica
2019 disestablishments in Jamaica
Recurring events established in 1961
Recurring events disestablished in 2019